The c-myc internal ribosome entry site (IRES) is an RNA element present in the 5' UTR of the mRNA of C-myc and allows cap-independent translation. The mammalian c-myc gene is a proto-oncogene which is required for cell proliferation, transformation and death. c-myc mRNA has an alternative method of translation via internal ribosome entry where ribosomes are recruited to the IRES located in the 5' UTR thus bypassing the typical eukaryotic cap-dependent translation pathway.

References

External links 
 

Cis-regulatory RNA elements